Jüri Jaakson's cabinet was in office in Estonia from 16 December 1924 to 15 December 1925, when it was succeeded by Jaan Teemant's first cabinet.

Members

This cabinet's members were the following:

References

Cabinets of Estonia